This article is one of a series providing information about endemism among birds in the world's various zoogeographic zones.

Patterns of endemism
Under the most up-to-date taxonomy, there are 237 bird species endemic to the Philippines. Many of these are restricted to specific islands, particularly Luzon, Mindanao, and Palawan. The number of endemic species recognized in the Philippines has increased in recent years, mainly due to "splits" of species and, to a much lesser extent, due to the discovery of previously unknown species. An example of splitting is the division of the erstwhile species Philippine hawk-owl (Ninox scutulata) into seven species, now called by the name of this-or-that boobook (Luzon boobook, Mindoro boobook, etc. see the list below). Another example is the split of the erstwhile tarictric hornbill (Penelopides panini), itself a Philippines endemic, into four or five separate species (Visayan hornbill, Luzon hornbill, Mindoro hornbill, Mindanao hornbill and possibly Samar hornbill, whose status as distinct from Mindanao hornbill is being debated). The split of the greater flameback (Chrysocolaptes lucidus) is another example. The greater flameback has been split into eight species, four of which are endemic to the Philippines (Luzon flameback, yellow-faced flameback, buff-spotted flameback and red-headed flameback).

In addition to the splitting, there has been much taxonomic reassignment of species to new  families, particularly affecting the babblers, many of which have now been assigned to Locustellidae (grass warblers) or Zosteropidae (white-eyes).

However the taxonomy is organized, very few countries exceed the Philippines in number of endemic bird species. Indonesia, Brazil and Australia exceed the Philippines, but these are much larger countries. There are seven distinct Endemic Bird Areas in the Philippines: (1) Mindoro, (2) Luzon, (3) Negros and Panay, (4) Cebu, (5) Mindanao and the Eastern Visayas, (6) the Sulu Archipelago and (7) Palawan.

In the context of Philippines bird endemics, the rhabdornis merit special discussion. The affinities of these birds with other species has long been under debate. In the past, many taxonomists considered the rhabdornis to form a distinct endemic family of birds restricted to the Philippines (Rhabdornithidae). Other taxonomists have considered the rhabdornis' to be a form of creeper (Certhiidae). Recent study tends to consider the rhabdornis to form a genus within the starling family (Sturnidae), although this view may be subject to further revision. Four species of rhabdornis are currently recognized (strip-sided, long-billed, stripe-breasted and Visayan). Whether or not the rhabdornis represent an endemic Philippines family, the four rhabdornis species are all endemic to the Philippines.

Many species of Philippine birds are also found in the Talaud Islands north of Sulawesi, which are part of Indonesia. Technically, those birds are not Philippine endemics. However, considering the small size and remote location of the Talaud Islands, it may be justified to consider those species as Philippine endemics for practical purposes. Individual cases are discussed below.

Many of the Philippine endemic species are rare and endangered; two of the birds are possibly extinct.

List of species

The species listed follow the taxonomic order of A Guide to the Birds of the Philippines by Robert Kennedy et al. The English names of some birds have been subject to recent change; in those cases an "also-known-as" (aka) is indicated. Some deviation from the Kennedy taxonomic order has been necessary due to reassignment of species to different families by the International Ornithological Committee.

Philippine duck, Anas luzonica
Philippine serpent eagle, Spilornis holospilus
Philippine eagle, Pithecophaga jefferyi
Philippine hawk-eagle, Nisaetus philippensis
Pinsker's hawk-eagle, Nisaetus pinskeri
Philippine falconet, Microhierax erythrogenys
Palawan peacock-pheasant, Polyplectron napoleonis
Worcester's buttonquail, Turnix worcesteri
Spotted buttonquail, Turnix ocellata
Luzon rail aka brown-banded rail, Lewinia mirifica
Calayan rail, Aptenorallus calayanensis
Plain bush-hen, Amaurornis olivacea
Bukidnon woodcock, Scolapax bukidnonensis
Philippine green pigeon, Treron axillaris
White-eared brown dove, Phapitreron leucotis
Amethyst brown dove, Phapitreron amethystina
Dark-eared brown dove, Phapitreron brunneiceps
Tawitawi brown dove, Phapitreron cinereiceps
Flame-breasted fruit-dove, Ptilinopus marchei
Cream-breasted fruit-dove, Ptilinopus merrilli
Yellow-breasted fruit-dove, Ptilinopus occipitalis
Black-chinned fruit-dove, Ptilinopus leclandheri
Negros fruit-dove, Ptilinopus arcanus (possibly extinct)
Pink-bellied imperial-pigeon, Ducula poliocephala
Spotted imperial-pigeon, Ducula carola
Philippine collared dove, Streptopelia tenuirostris
Luzon bleeding-heart, Gallicolumba luzonica
Mindanao bleeding-heart, Gallicomba criniger
Sulu bleeding-heart, Gallicolumba menagei (possibly extinct)
Negros bleeding-heart, Gallicolumba keayi
Mindoro bleeding-heart, Gallicolumba platenae
Mindanao lorikeet, Trichoglossus johnstoniae
Guaiabero, Bolbopsittacus lunulatus
Philippine cockatoo, Cacatua haematuropgia
Green racquet-tail, Prioniturus luconensis
Luzon racquet-tail, Prioniturus montanus
Mindoro racket-tail, Prioniturus mindorensis
Blue-headed racquet-tail, Prioniturus platenae
Mindanao racquet-tail, Prioniturus waterstradti
Blue-winged racquet-tail, Prioniturus verticalis
Blue-crowned racquet-tail, Prioniturus discurus
Philippine hanging-parrot aka Colasisi, Loriculus philippensis
Philippine hawk-cuckoo, Hierococcyx pectoralis
Philippine drongo-cuckoo, Surniculus velutinus
Scale-feathered malkoha, Dasylophus cumingi
Red-crested malkoha, Dasylophus superciliosus
Black-hooded coucal, Centropus steerii
Philippine coucal, Centropus viridis
Black-faced coucal, Centropus melanops
Rufous coucal, Centropus unirfus
Mindoro scops-owl, Otus mindorensis
Luzon scops-owl, Otus longicornis
Mantanani scops-owl, Otus mantananensis
Palawan scops-owl, Otus fuliginosus
Philippine scops-owl, Otus megalotis
Mindanao scops-owl, Otus mirus
Giant scops owl, Otus gurneyi
Philippine eagle-owl, Buba philippensis
Luzon boobook, Ninox philippensis
Chocolate boobook, Ninox randi
Mindanao boobook, Ninox spilocephala
Mindoro boobook, Ninox mindorensis
Romblon boobook, Ninox spilonotus
Cebu boobook, Ninox rumseyi
Camiguin boobook, Ninox leventisi
Sulu boobook, Ninox reyi
Philippine frogmouth, Batrachostomus septimus
Philippine nightjar, Caprimulgus manillensis
Whitehead's swiftlet, Aerodramus whiteheadi
Ameline swiftlet, Aerodramus amelis
Philippine swiftlet, Aerodramus mearnsi
Pygmy swiftlet, Collocalia troglodytes
Gray-rumped swiftlet, Collocalia marginata
Philippine spine-tailed swift, Mearnsia picina
Philippine trogon, Harpactes ardens
Indigo-banded kingfisher, Ceyx cyanopecta
Northern silvery kingfisher, Ceyx flumenicola 
Southern silvery kingfisher, Ceyx argentatus
Philippine dwarf kingfisher, Ceyx melanurus
Rufous-lored kingfisher, Todiramphus winchelli
Spotted kingfisher aka spotted wood-kingfisher, Actenoides lindsayi
Blue-capped kingfisher aka blue-capped wood-kingfisher aka Hombron's wood-kingfisher, Actenoides hombroni
Rufous-crowned bee-eater, Merops americanus
Visayan hornbill, Penelopides panini
Luzon hornbill, Penelopides manillae
Mindoro hornbill, Penelopides mindorensis
Samar hornbill, Penelopides samarensis
Mindanao hornbill, Penelopides affinis
Writhed-billed hornbill aka Walden's hornbill, Rhabdotorrhinus waldeni
Writhed hornbill, Rhabdotorrhinus leucocephalus
Sulu hornbill, Anthracoceros montani
Palawan hornbill, Anthracoceros marchei
Rufous hornbill, Buceros hydrocorax
Philippine woodpecker, Yungipicus maculatus
Northern sooty woodpecker, Mulleripicus funebris
Southern sooty woodpecker, Mulleripicus fuliginosus
Luzon flameback, Chrysocolaptes haematribon
Yellow-faced flameback, Chrysocolaptes xanthocephalus
Buff-spotted flameback, Chrysocolaptes lucidus
Red-headed flameback, Chrysocolaptes erythrocephalus
Wattled broadbill, Eurylaimus steeri
Visayan broadbill, Eurylaimus samarensis
Whiskered pitta, Erythropitta kochi
Philippine pitta, Erythropitta eryhthrogaster
Azure-breasted pitta aka Steer's pitta, Pitta steeri
Blackish cuckoo-shrike, Analisoma coerelescens
White-winged cuckoo-shrike, Analisoma ostenta
Black-bibbed cuckoo-shrike, Edalisoma mindanense
McGregor's cuckoo-shrike, Malindangia mcgregori
Black-and-white triller, Lalage melanoleuca
Philippine leafbird, Chloropsis flavipennis
Yellow-throated leafbird, Chloropsis palawanensis
Yellow-wattled bulbul, Brachypodius urostictus
Ashy-fronted bulbul, Pycnonotus cinereifrons
Gray-throated bulbul aka Palawan bulbul, Alophoixus frater
Sulphur-bellied bulbul, Iole palawanensis
Philippine bulbul, Hypsipetes philippinus
Zamboanga bulbul, Hypsipetes rufigularis
Streak-breasted bulbul, Hypsipetes siquijorensis
Yellowish bulbul, Hypsipetes everetti
Camiguin bulbul, "Hypsipetes catarmanensis"
Balicassiao, Dicrurus balicassius
Philippine oriole, Oriolus steeri
Isabela oriole, Oriolus isabellae
Philippine fairy-bluebird, Irena cyanogaster
Palawan fairy-bluebird, Irena tweeddalii
Palawan tit, Periparus amabilis
Elegant tit, Periparus elegans
White-fronted tit, Sittiparus semilarvatus
Sulphur-billed nuthatch, Sitta oenochlamys
Ashy-headed babbler, Pellorneum cinereiceps
Palawan babbler, Malacopteron palawanense
Falcated wren-babbler, Ptilocichla falcata
Striated wren-babbler, Ptilocichla mindanensis
Rusty-crowned babbler, Sterrhoptilus capitalis
Black-crowned babbler, Sterrhoptilus nigrocapitatis
Calabarzon babbler, Sterrhoptilus affinis
Golden-crowned babbler, Sterrhoptilus dennistouni
Brown tit-babbler, Macronus striaticeps
Leyte plumed-warbler, split from miniature tit-babbler, Leyte form (now classified as a type of cisticola), Micromacronus leytensis
Mindanao plumed-warbler, split from miniature tit-babbler, Mindanao form (now classified as a type of cisticola), Micromacronus sordidus
Visayan pygmy-babbler, Dasycrotapha pygmaea
Mindanao pygmy-babbler, Dasycrotapha plateni
Flame-templed babbler, Dasycrotapha speciosa
Chestnut-faced babbler, Zosterornis whiteheadi
Luzon striped-babbler, Zosterornis striatus
Panay striped-babbler, Zosterornis latistriatus
Negros striped-babbler, Zosterornis nigrorum
Palawan striped-babbler, Zosterornis hypogrammicus
Ashy thrush, Geokichla cinerea
Philippine leaf-warbler, Phylloscopus olivaceous
Lemon-throated leaf-warbler, Phylloscopus cebuensis
Philippine tailorbird, Orthotomus castaneiceps
Gray-backed tailorbird, Orthotomus derbianus
Green-backed tailorbird, Orthotomus chloronotus
Yellow-breasted tailorbird, Orthotomus samarensis
White-browed tailorbird, Orthotomus nigriceps
White-eared tailorbird, Orthotomus cinereiceps
Rufous-fronted tailorbird, Orthotomus frontalis
Rufous-headed tailorbird (now classified as a type of bush-warbler), Phyllergates heterolaemus
Philippine bush-warbler, Horornis seebohmi
Benguet bush-warbler (now classified as a type of grassbird), Locustella seebohmi
Long-tailed bush-warbler (now classified as a type of grassbird), Locustella caudatus
Cordillera ground warbler (formerly classified as a babbler, now as a grassbird), Robsonius rabori
Sierra Madre ground warbler (formerly classified as a babbler, now as a grassbird), Robsonius thompsoni
Bicol ground warbler (formerly classified as a babbler, now as a grassbird), Robsonius sorsogonensis
Bagobo babbler (now classified as a type of Old World flycatcher), Leonardina woodi
White-throated jungle flycatcher, Vauriella albigularis
Rusty-flanked jungle-flycatcher aka white-browed jungle-flycatcher aka Luzon jungle flycatcher, Vauriella insignis
Mindanao jungle-flycatcher aka Goodfellow's jungle-flycatcher, Vauriella goodfellowi
Ashy-breasted flycatcher, Muscicapa randi
Little slaty flycatcher, Ficedula basilanica
Palawan flycatcher, Ficedula platenae
Cryptic flycatcher, Ficedula crypta
Blue-breasted flycatcher, Cyornis herioti
Palawan blue-flycatcher, Cyornis lemprieri
Philippine magpie-robin, Copsychus mindanensis
White-browed shama, Copsychus luzoneinsis
Visayan shama, Copsychus superciliaris
White-vented shama, Copsychus niger
Black shama, Copsychus cebuensis
Luzon redstart, Phoenicurus bicolor
Philippine pied fantail, Rhipidura nigritorquis
Mindanao blue fantail, Rhipidura superciliaris
Visayan blue fantail, Rhipidura samarensis
Blue-headed fantail, Rhipidura cyaniceps
Visayan fantail, Rhipidura albiventris
Black-and-cinnamon fantail, Rhipidura nigrocinnamomea
Tablas fantail, Rhipidura sauli
Rufous paradise-flycatcher, Terpsiphone cinnamomea
Blue paradise-flycatcher, Terpsiphone cyanescens
Celestial monarch, Hypothymis coelestis
Short-crested monarch, Hypothymis helenae
Green-backed whistler, Pachycephala albiventris
White-vented whistler, Pachycephala homeyeri
Yellow-bellied whistler, Pachycephala philippinensis
Gray-capped shrike, Lanius validirostris
Small crow, "Corvus samarensis"
Palawan crow, "Corvus pusillus"
Coleto, Sarcops calvus
Apo myna, Goodfellowia miranda
Stripe-sided rhabdornis, Rhabdornis mystacalis
Long-billed rhabdornis, Rhabdornis grandis
Stripe-breasted rhabdornis, Rhabdornis inornatus
Visayan rhabdornis, Rhabdornis rabori
Gray-throated sunbird, Anthreptes griseigularis
Flaming sunbird, Aethopyga flagrans
Gray-hooded sunbird, Aethopyga primigenia
Luzon sunbird, Aethopyga jefferyi
Metallic-winged sunbird, Aethopyga pulcherrima
Apo sunbird, Aethopyga boltoni
Lina's sunbird, Aethopyga linaraborae
Bohol sunbird, Aethopyga decorosa
Lovely sunbird, Aethopyga shelleyi
Handsome sunbird, Aethopyga bella
Naked-faced spiderhunter, Arachnothera clarae
Pale spiderhunter, Arachnothera dilutior
Olive-backed flowerpecker, Prionochilus olivaceous
Palawan flowerpecker, Prionochilus plateni
Olive-capped flowerpecker, Dicaeum nigrilore
Flame-crowned flowerpecker, Dicaeum kampalili
Yellow-crowned flowerpecker, Dicaeum anthonyi
Bicolored flowerpecker, Dicaeum bicolor
Whiskered flowerpecker, Dicaeum proprium
Cebu flowerpecker, Dicaeum quadricolor
Red-keeled flowerpecker, Dicaeum australe
Scarlet-collared flowerpecker, Dicaeum retrocinctum
Black-belted flowerpecker, Dicaeum haematostictum
Buzzing flowerpecker, Dicaeum hypoleucum
Pygmy flowerpecker, Dicaeum pygmaeum
Lowland white-eye, Zosterops meyeni
Yellowish white-eye, Zosterops nigrorum
Mindanao white-eye, Lophozosterops goodfellowi
Cinnamon ibon (now classified as an Old World sparrow, Passeridae), Hypocryptadius cinnamomeus
Green-faced parrotfinch, Erythrura viridifacies
Red-eared parrotfinch, Erythrura coloria
Mindanao serin, Chrysocorythus mindanensis
White-cheeked bullfinch, Pyrrhula leucogenis

Difficult cases
 The Philippine form of the reddish cuckoo-dove, Macropygia phasianella, is considered by some authorities to be a separate species under the name Philippine cuckoo-dove, Macropygia tenuirostris. However, it is not clear whether the form of the bird found in Borneo should be considered M. phasianella, M. tenuirostris, or a separate species. For now, the Philippine cuckoo-dove is not included in the endemic list.
 The Philippine collared-dove, Streptopelia dusumieri, has been recorded in northern Borneo, but not since the 1960s. The bird has also been introduced on some of the Mariana Islands. This bird is included in the Phlippines endemic list since its current presence in Borneo is not confirmed and its presence in the Mariana Islands is man made.
 The gray imperial-pigeon, Ducula pickeringii, is found exclusively on a few small islands on the south and southwest side of the main Philippines Archipelago, mainly islands in the Sulu Sea and offshore of Palawan. Most of the islands where the gray imperial-pigeon is found are part of the Philippines, although it is also found on two island groups in Indonesia (the very small Derawan Islands off of eastern Borneo and the larger Talaud Island group north of Sulawesi). The bird is not included in the Philippines endemic list.
 While found mainly in the Phlippines, the blue-naped parrot, Tanygnathus lucionensis, is also found in the Talaud Island group north of Sulawesi, which is part of Indonesia. The bird is not therefore included in the Philippines endemics list.
 The Mantanani scops-owl is named after Mantanani Island, a tiny island off the north coast of Sabah, Malaysia (Borneo). However, other than on that small Malaysian island, the bird is found entirely in several small Philippine islands: Sibutu, Tablas, Romblon, the Calamian Islands north of Palawan, the Cuyo Island group. The bird is included in the Philippines endemics list.
 The Philippines form of the uniform swiftlet, Aerodramus vanikorensis, (itself previously known as the island swiftlet) has recently been designated by the International Ornithological Committee as a different species, the Ameline swiftlet Aerodramus amelis. The Ameline swiftlet is included in the Philippines endemic list.
 Authorities differ on whether the Samar form of the tarictic hornbill is a distinct species Penelopides samarensis, or whether it is a form of the Mindanao hornbill, Penelopides affinis. It is included in the list of Phlippines endemics.
 The blue-breasted pitta, Erythropitta erythrogaster, is a recent split from the Australasian "red-bellied" pitta group. The blue-breasted pitta is found throughout the Philippines and also in the Talaud Island group of Indonesia. For now, it is included in the Philippines endemic list.
 There is a consideration that the Mindoro form and the Visayan form of the Philippine bulbul, Hypsipetes philippinus, should be classed as separate species, Mindoro bulbul, Hypsipetes mindorensis, and Visayan bulbul, Hypsipetes guimarasensis, respectively, but this seems to be not quite agreed yet amongst the authorities. For now, only the Philippine bulbul is listed as a Philippines endemic.
 The Palawan form of the Asian fairy-bluebird, Irena puella, is coming to be viewed as a potentially different species Irena tweeddalii. Since this seems to be still in discussion, this bird in not included in the Philippines endemic list.
 The 2021 International Ornithological Committee has approved several splits that increase the number of Philippines endemics. They are as follows: (a) The Philippines versions of the slender-billed crow, Corvus enca, are defined as two new species, small crow, Corvus samarensis, found in the main Philippines islands, and Palawan crow, Corvus pusillus, found on Palawan. (b) The Camiguin form of the yellowish bulbul, Hypsipetes everetti, itself a Philippines endemic, is defined as a new species. The new species is called Camiguin bulbul, Hypsipetes catarmanensis. (c) The endemic black-crowned babbler, Sterrhoptilus nigrocapitatus, has been split, with the form found in Luzon called the Calabarzon babbler, Sterrhoptilus affinis. (d) The Palawn form of the Asian fairy-bluebird, Irena puella, has been defined as a new species, the Palawan fairy-bluebird, Irena tweeddalli. (e) The endemic flame-crowned flowerpecker, Dicaeum anthonyi, has been split into two species called yellow-crowned flowerpecker, Dicaeum anthonyi and flame-crowned flowerpecker, Dicaeum kampalili. The original English name stays with the Mindanao form of the bird, which takes a new Latin name, and original Latin name of the bird stays with the Luzon form, which takes a new English name. (f) The Mindanao form of the mountain serin, Chrysocorythus estherae has been split from the Indonesian forms, with the new name Mindanao serin, Chrysocorythus estherae.
 Everett's white-eye, Zosterops everetti, previously considered to be distributed widely across SE Asia, including the southern Philippine Islands, has been split by the 2020 International Ornithological Committee Bird List revision, with the Everett's white-eye now considered as restricted to the southern Philippines and the Talaud Island group of Indonesia. The form of the bird found elsewhere in SE Asia is now to be called Hume's white-eye, Zosterops auriventur. The Everett's white-eye is not included in the Philippines endemics list since it is also found in the Talaud Islands.
 Recent taxonomic changes have drastically reduced the number of endemic babbler species in the Philippines. Eleven endemic Philippine species previously considered babblers have been reassigned to the white-eye family Zosteropidae. In addition, two endemic babblers have been reassigned to the cisticola family Cisticolidae, three endemic babblers have been renamed "ground warblers" and assigned to the grassbird family Locustella and one endemic babbler has been renamed as a robin and assigned to the Old World flycatchers, Muscicapidae. These changes do not alter the total number of Philippine endemic species, but have moved endemic species into new families.

See also
Lists of biota of the Philippines
List of threatened species of the Philippines

References

'
'birds
birds
Philippines